= Pakka Di Saral =

- Union council
- Location within Pakistan
- Coordinates: 33.18°N 73.20°E
- Country: Pakistan
- Province: (Islamabad Capital Territory) Islamabad C.T
- Elevation: 441 m (1,447 ft)

Population
  - Total: 117,535
- Time zone: UTC+5 (PST)

Pakka Di Saral is a Union council in the Islamabad Capital Territory of Pakistan. It is located at 33° 18' 45N 73° 20' 25E with an altitude of 441 metres (1450 feet).
